Ines Pochert-Bautzmann (born 20 May 1958) is a German speed skater. She competed in three events at the 1976 Winter Olympics.

References

External links
 

1958 births
Living people
German female speed skaters
Olympic speed skaters of East Germany
Speed skaters at the 1976 Winter Olympics
Sportspeople from Dresden